This page lists board and card games, wargames, miniature games, and tabletop role-playing games published in 2004. For video games, see 2004 in video gaming.

Games released or invented in 2004

Game awards given in 2004
 Gamer's Choice Award (Origins Awards): Babylon 5: A Call to Arms
 International Gamers Award: Memoir '44
 Schweizer Spielepreis: Ingenious
 Spiel des Jahres: Ticket to Ride
 Games: BuyWord

See also
 2004 in video gaming

Games
Games by year